Maxon Crumb (born March 28, 1945, in Albert Lea, Minnesota)  is the younger brother of underground cartoonist Robert Crumb and Charles Crumb, and the uncle of Sophie Crumb.

Biography 
Maxon Crumb was born in 1945 to Charles and Beatrice Crumb. His early work can be found in publications such as Weirdo, Liquidator, Maxon's Poe (1997), and Crumb Family Comics (Last Gasp, 1998).

His first published novel, HardCore Mother (2000) was a study of incest and sadism. After its publication in 2001, his work found a wider audience.

Maxon Crumb was featured in the documentary Crumb, about his brother, Robert.

Art practice 
Maxon Crumb initially started painting as a way to deal with his own personal demons. He has subsequently managed to earn money from his art.

His paintings and ink drawings can take weeks or months to complete. During this time, Maxon says that he will enter into an intense creative state where the work becomes paramount, to the detriment of normal everyday concerns, including eating.

Maxon Crumb's drawings are available online as well as fine art limited-edition prints.

Personal life 
In addition to his brothers Charles and Robert, Maxon also had two sisters, Carol DeGennaro (1941–2020) and Sandra Colorado (1946–1998).

Maxon practices celibacy and has done so for many years because, as he has explained in interviews, for him, sex triggers epileptic seizures.
In the 1994 documentary Crumb, Maxon Crumb admitted to a history of sexually assaulting women.

"I’d see Maxon Crumb sitting on Market Street, cross-legged with his bowl in front of him."

References

External links
 'The Maxon BackStory' Podcast, SFGate.com
 
 review of  Malcolm Whyte’s illustrated biography of Maxon, Art Out of Chaos (F.U. Press. 2018

 

1945 births
Living people
People with epilepsy
American people of Scottish descent
American people of English descent